Gojjam (  gōjjām, originally ጐዛም gʷazzam, later ጐዣም gʷažžām, ጎዣም gōžžām) is a historical province in northwestern Ethiopia, with its capital city at Debre Marqos.

Gojjam's earliest western boundary extended up unto the triangle to ancient Meroë in Sudan. By 1700, Gojjam's western neighbors were Agawmeder in the southwest and Qwara in the northwest. Agawmeder, never an organized political entity, was gradually absorbed by Gojjam until it reached west to the Sultanate of Gubba; Juan Maria Schuver noted in his journeys in Agawmeder (September 1882) that in three prior months, "the Abyssinians considerably advanced their frontier towards the West, effacing what was left of the independent regions." Gubba acknowledged its dependence to Emperor Menelik II in 1898, but by 1942 was absorbed into Gojjam. Dek Island in Lake Tana was administratively part of Gojjam until 1987.

History 
The ancient history of Gojjam is mostly associated with religion. During the pre-Christianity era Mertule Maryam and Gish Abay, which were located in the eastern and central parts of Gojjam respectively, were places of worship. Along with Tana Qirqos on Lake Tana, the Church of Our Lady Mary of Zion in Tigray, and Tadbaba Maryam in Wollo Province, Mertule Maryam was a place where animal sacrifices were made for worship. Gish Abay is also considered a sacred place for being the source of the Blue Nile or Abay, also called Felege Ghion in Geʽez. Ghion is believed to be the Biblical name of the Nile mentioned in the Book of Genesis as one of the four rivers which flow out of Eden and encompasses the land of Ethiopia. Considering its location within the bend of the Abay River, the province of Gojjam is also referred to, especially by the church community, as Ghion or Felege Ghion.

The first church in Gojjam was built at Mertule Maryam, which became the first church in Ethiopia.

The earliest recorded mention of Gojjam was during the medieval period, in a note in a manuscript of Amda Seyon's military campaigns there and in Damot in 1309 EC (1316/7 CE), during which time it was incorporated into Ethiopia. It was also referenced on the Egyptus Novello map, (c. 1451), where it is described as a kingdom (though it had by this time long been subject to the Emperor of Ethiopia). Emperor Dawit II, in his letter to the King of Portugal (1526), also described Gojjam as a kingdom but one that was part of his empire.

At least as early as Empress Eleni, Gojjam provided the revenues of the Empress until the Zemene Mesafint ("Era of the Judges"), when central authority was weak and the revenues were appropriated by Fasil of Damot. Gojjam then became a power base for a series of warlords at least as late as Ras Hailu Tekle Haymanot, who was deposed in 1932.

During the Italian occupation, Gojjam came to be the home of armed bands who resisted the Italian occupiers, whose leaders included Belay Zelleke, Mengesha Jemberie, Negash Bezabih and Hailu Belew. These resistance fighters, known as arbegnoch (or "Patriots"), limited the Italians to only the immediate areas around heavily fortified towns like Debre Markos. Belay Zelleke was even able to fully liberate and run civil administrations in the eastern part of Gojjam and some adjacent woredas in South Wollo and North Shoa. Since the Italians were unable to bring Gojjam under their control, the province was finally chosen by Emperor Haile Selassie as the safest way to return to Ethiopia. During his return, he was supported by the combined forces of the British army, Gojjamie Patriots, and other Ethiopians living abroad before then in fear of persecution by Italians. During the reign of Emperor Haile Selassie, however, the inhabitants of Gojjam rebelled several times due to resentment over ill-treatment of patriots and increased taxes, the latest occasion in 1968—about the same time as the Bale revolt. Unlike in Bale, the central government did not use a military solution to end the revolt, instead replacing the governors and reversing the attempt to levy new taxes; in response to the 1968 revolt, the central government went as far as waiving tax arrears back to 1950.

With the adoption of a new constitution in 1995, Gojjam was divided, with the westernmost part forming the majority of the Metekel Zone of the Benishangul-Gumuz Region, and the rest becoming the Agew Awi, the West Gojjam and the East Gojjam Zones of the Amhara Region.

See also
 Monarchies of Ethiopia
 History of Ethiopia

References 

History of Ethiopia
Provinces of Ethiopia
States and territories disestablished in 1995